Marion Eugene "Bud" Moodler (September 21, 1912 – August 7, 1977) was an American professional basketball player. He played in the National Basketball League for the Dayton Metropolitans during the 1937–38 season and the Detroit Eagles during the 1939–40 season; for his career he averaged 2.1 points per game. In his post-basketball life, McMahon worked as a toolmaker for 32 years.

References

1912 births
1977 deaths
American men's basketball players
United States Army personnel of World War II
Basketball players from Ohio
Dayton Metropolitans players
Defiance Yellow Jackets men's basketball players
Detroit Eagles players
Guards (basketball)
People from Montgomery, Ohio